Nikolaos Vilaetis (Greek: Νικόλαος Βιλαέτης, 1835–1860) was a chief of Pyrgos and a Greek politician.  He descended from a famous family of Pyrgos in which he was one of the first who inhabited the area.  He was the cousin of Yiannis and brother of Haralambos.  He was the chief of Pyrgos and was elected as an attorney of Ilia in the First National Council, in December 1821, months after the start of the Greek War of Independence, he later entered politics.

References
The first version of the article is translated and is based from the article at the Greek Wikipedia (el:Main Page)

1835 births
1860 deaths
Greek politicians
Politicians from Elis
Vilaetis family
People from Pyrgos, Elis